In mathematics, the Dini and Dini–Lipschitz tests are highly precise tests that can be used to prove that the Fourier series of a function converges at a given point. These tests are named after Ulisse Dini and Rudolf Lipschitz.

Definition 

Let  be a function on [0,2], let  be some point and let  be a positive number. We define the local modulus of continuity at the point  by

The global modulus of continuity (or simply the modulus of continuity) is defined by

With these definitions we may state the main results:

Theorem (Dini's test): Assume a function  satisfies at a point  that

Theorem (the Dini–Lipschitz test): Assume a function  satisfies

In particular, any function of a Hölder class satisfies the Dini–Lipschitz test.

Precision

Both tests are the best of their kind.

and the Fourier series of  diverges. For the Dini test, the statement of precision is slightly longer: it says that for any function Ω such that 

there exists a function  such that 

and the Fourier series of  diverges at 0.

See also

 Convergence of Fourier series
 Dini continuity
 Dini criterion

References

Fourier series
Convergence tests